Strahl is a German word that means 'ray' or 'beam'. It may refer to the following:

 Strähl, a 2004 Swiss film
 Strahl (astronomy), a part of the  solar wind electron velocity distribution that forms a beam
 Strahl (video game), a computer game

People
 Chuck Strahl (born 1957), a Canadian politician
 Erwin Strahl (1929–2011), Austrian actor
 Mark Strahl (born 1978), a Canadian politician
 Otho F. Strahl (1831–1864), an American soldier
 Rudi Strahl (1931 - 2001), a German playwright, novelist and poet

See also
 Strähle construction, a geometrical technique for arranging the frets of some string instruments.
 Bremsstrahlung,  "braking radiation", produced by the deceleration of a charged particle